"Wild World" is a song written and recorded by English singer-songwriter Cat Stevens. It first appeared on his fourth album, Tea for the Tillerman, recorded and released in 1970.

Song meaning
Stevens developed a relationship with actress Patti D'Arbanville and the two were a pair throughout a period of roughly two years. During that time, he wrote several songs about her, including "Wild World".

The song is in the form of the singer's words to his departing lover, inspired by the end of their romance. Stevens later recalled to Mojo: "It was one of those chord sequences that's very common in Spanish music. I turned it around and came up with that theme—which is a recurring theme in my work—which is to do with leaving, the sadness of leaving, and the anticipation of what lies beyond."

Released as a single in late 1970, it peaked at No. 11 on the Billboard Hot 100 chart. "Wild World" has been credited as the song that gave Stevens' next album, Tea for the Tillerman, "enough kick" to get it played on FM radio; and Island Records' Chris Blackwell called it "the best album we've ever released".

In November 2008, the Tea for the Tillerman CD was re-issued in a deluxe version which included the original demo of "Wild World".

Interpretation

Some critics and music writers have deemed "Wild World" to be condescending and misogynistic. In her 1971 essay "But Now I'm Gonna Move," critic Ellen Willis described a method of revealing male bias in lyrics in which the listener imagines the genders reversed:

Personnel
 Cat Stevens – classical guitar, acoustic guitar, keyboards, lead vocals
 Alun Davies – acoustic guitar, backing vocals
 Harvey Burns – drums, congas, tambourine
 John Ryan – double bass

Charts

Weekly charts

Year-end charts

Certifications

Cover versions
The song has been covered by many artists, with many of the covers becoming hits of their own. Jimmy Cliff's version, released a few months after Stevens released the original version, reached No. 8 on the UK Singles Chart. Surprisingly, Stevens' version was not released as a single in the UK. Some of the subsequent covers have also been in the reggae style, such as Maxi Priest's version of the song. Recorded and released as a single in 1988, this version also did well on the charts, reaching No. 5 on the UK Singles Chart and No. 25 on the US Billboard Hot 100.

In 1987, Jonathan King accused Pet Shop Boys of plagiarising the melody of "Wild World" for their UK No. 1 single "It's a Sin". He made the claims in The Sun, for which he wrote a regular column during the 1980s. King also released his own cover version of "Wild World" as a single, using a similar musical arrangement to "It's a Sin", in an effort to demonstrate his claims. This single flopped, while Pet Shop Boys sued King, eventually winning out-of-court damages, which they donated to charity.

On 7 July 2007, the song was performed twice at the Live Earth concerts. James Blunt sang it at Wembley Stadium in London, England, while Stevens (by then known as Yusuf Islam) himself sang it in Hamburg, Germany.

In 2011, Taiwanese-American singer Joanna Wang released her own version on her album The Things We Do for Love. Wang's version was also featured in American web television series The Good Fight Season 1, 2017.

Notable covers
 1970: Jimmy Cliff
 1971: Claude François (Fleur sauvage)
 1971: Barry Ryan
 1971: Bette Midler
 1971: José Feliciano	
 1971: The Gentrys
 1971: The Ventures
 1971: Franck Pourcel (Instrumental version)
 1971: Sacha Distel
 1987: Jonathan King
 1989: SNFU
 1993: Mr. Big
 1994: Wise Guys
 2000: Pepê & Neném
 2001: Me First and the Gimme Gimmes
 2003: Skye Sweetnam (Billy S. – B-side)
 2004: John Waite
 2007: Skins cast, led by Mike Bailey
 2007: James Blunt
 2010: Ronan Keating (feat. Marvin Priest)
 2012: Andy Allo
 2013: Garth Brooks
 2018: Bastille (feat. Kianja)
 2018: Marion Raven (Live version for her acoustic tour in Norway)
 2020: Mick McGuigan (live at home)

Maxi Priest version

In 1988 English reggae vocalist Maxi Priest recorded a cover of the song, which was released as the third single from his album, Maxi (1987). The single charted at No. 25 on the Billboard Hot 100. In Europe it was very successful, peaking at No. 3 in Norway, No. 5 in Belgium, Ireland, New Zealand, and the UK, No. 7 in the Netherlands, and No. 8 in Australia.

Charts

Weekly charts

Year-end charts

Mr. Big version

In 1993, American rock band Mr. Big released a cover of "Wild World" on their third album, Bump Ahead (1993). The single charted at No. 27 on the Billboard Hot 100, No. 33 on the Top 40 Mainstream and No. 12 on the Mainstream Top 40. In Europe, it was very successful, peaking at No. 4 in Denmark, No. 7 in Austria and Switzerland, at No. 10 in Norway, Sweden and Netherlands and No. 13 in Iceland.

Critical reception
Larry Flick from Billboard described it as "a relatively faithful cover". He added, "Pleasing lead vocals and tightly knit harmonies weave around cowboy-like acoustic strumming and nimble-but-subtle electric doodling. Warmly familiar, easy-going track". Troy J. Augusto from Cashbox commented, "Back to ballad-land again with a credible cover of the Cat Stevens classic." Dave Sholin from the Gavin Report called it a "soulful, sensitive approach with a slight rock edge." He noted further that lead singer Eric Martin "is powerful without overpowering the song."

Another editor, Kent Zimmerman complimented its "decidedly wooden, unplugged flavor". Alan Jones from Music Week said it is "rendered in the low key intimate rock ballad style recently deployed by the likes of Metallica, Extreme and Little Angels. Mr. Big carry it of very well and can expect a modest hit." John Kilgo from The Network Forty noted that it "sounds remarkably similar to the 1971 original", adding that it "will sound like a fresh, new song to the younger demographics."

Music video
The accompanying music video for "Wild World" was directed by Nancy Bennett.

Track listing

Charts

Weekly charts

Year-end charts

References 

1970 songs
1970 singles
1988 singles
1993 singles
Cat Stevens songs
Maxi Priest songs
Jonathan King songs
Mr. Big (American band) songs
British pop rock songs
Rock ballads
Songs written by Cat Stevens
Song recordings produced by Paul Samwell-Smith
A&M Records singles
Island Records singles
Atlantic Records singles
1970s ballads
Pop ballads